Joseph Haboush (born August 28, 1990) is an American former soccer player who played as a midfielder. He is of Lebanese descent.

Career

Early career
Haboush started his youth playing career with the Richmond Strikers Under-16 Academy and the Elite Under-18 Academy before playing Division 1 college soccer with the VCU Rams of the Virginia Commonwealth University from 2008 to 2012. While at VCU Haboush made 56 appearances for the soccer team and scored three goals at the same time along with 10 assists. Haboush also went to high-school at Benedictine High School where he earned first team All-Metro player honors while helping the team win the State Championship in 2006.

Richmond Kickers
On February 12, 2013, it was officially announced that Haboush was the first signing for the Richmond Kickers, his local side, of the USL Pro. On April 6, Haboush made his debut for the Richmond Kickers against the Pittsburgh Riverhounds in which he started and played the whole 90 minutes as the match ended tied at 0–0.

Safa
On October 18, 2013, it was officially announced that Haboush signed a contract with Safa of the Lebanese Premier League.

References

External links 
 
 Richmond Kickers Profile

1990 births
Living people
Sportspeople from Richmond, Virginia
Soccer players from Richmond, Virginia
American people of Lebanese descent
Sportspeople of Lebanese descent
American soccer players
Association football midfielders
VCU Rams men's soccer players
Richmond Kickers players
Safa SC players
USL Championship players
Lebanese Premier League players